The 2008 African Women's Championship qualification process was organized by the Confederation of African Football (CAF) to decide the participating teams of the 2008 African Women's Championship. Equatorial Guinea qualified automatically as hosts, while the remaining seven spots were determined by qualifying rounds, which took place from November 2007 to March 2008.

Teams
A total of 22 national teams entered qualification. The qualification was in two rounds, with each match taking place over 2 legs. In the first round, the 16 lowest-ranked nations were drawn in pairs. The eight winners joined six other national teams in the 2nd round, where the seven winners together with the hosts qualified for the finals.

Teams who withdrew before playing a match are in italics.

Format
Qualification ties were played on a home-and-away two-legged basis. If the aggregate score was tied after the second leg, the away goals rule would be applied, and if still level, the penalty shoot-out would be used to determine the winner (no extra time would be played).

The seven winners of the final round qualified for the final tournament.

Schedule
The schedule of the qualifying rounds was as follows.

First round
Was played between 30 November and 16 December 2007. Cameroon, Congo-Kinshasa, Ghana, Mali, Nigeria and South Africa had a bye to the second round.

Overview

|}
Egypt, Burundi and Benin withdrew their matches.

Matches

Algeria won 3–1 on aggregate.

Tunisia advanced on walkover after Egypt withdrew.

Second round
Played between 24 February and 8 March 2008.

Overview

|}

Matches

Algeria won 2–1 on aggregate.

Qualified teams
The following teams qualified for the final tournament.

1 Bold indicates champions for that year. Italic indicates hosts for that year.

References

CAF
Women
2008